Appley Dapply’s Nursery Rhymes is the first of two collections of nursery rhymes written and illustrated by Beatrix Potter.  It was first published in 1917.  The title character is a brown mouse who takes food out of a cupboard in someone else’s house.

References 
Footnotes

Works cited

External links

Official Peter Rabbit website

1917 children's books
Books by Beatrix Potter
Collections of nursery rhymes
Frederick Warne & Co books
Picture books by Beatrix Potter
British children's books